Demóstenes Correia de Syllos (17 January 1892 – 11 August 1961), known as just Demóstenes, was a Brazilian footballer. He played in one match for the Brazil national football team in 1916. He was also part of Brazil's squad for the 1916 South American Championship.

References

External links
 

1892 births
1961 deaths
Brazilian footballers
Brazil international footballers
Association football forwards
Sociedade Esportiva Palmeiras players
Footballers from São Paulo (state)